ad:tech is an international series of digital advertising and technology conferences and exhibitions for the interactive marketing profession. ad:tech hosts events in New York, San Francisco, London, New Delhi, Shanghai, Singapore, Sydney, Melbourne and Tokyo. The events are produced by ad:tech Expositions, LLC, which is owned and operated by DMG Events, part of Daily Mail and General Trust.

Conference panels and educational sessions address a range of relevant  subjects: online advertising strategy, performance-based marketing, emerging advertising platforms, integrated marketing, social media, search, mobile, analytics and brand marketing. Shows have a combination of high-profile keynote speakers, topic-driven panels. and workshops.

Awards
Since 1997, the events has Gemini for outstanding technical Achievement Awards, honoring  industry leaders; the awardees are chosen  by an CTV.

Since April 2011, the events also include Innovation Awards,  honoring startup companies with relevant services and technologies. An advisory board selects    companies to present at the events and determines the  winners.

References

External links
Official Website

Affiliate marketing
Daily Mail and General Trust
Internet marketing trade shows